The Academia Interamericana Metro (before  Academia del Sagrado Corazón) was founded in 1928 as a private and religious school in Santurce, Puerto Rico by Padre Ignacio de Dios García.  The school provides elementary and high school education and is located in Avenida Ponce de León, at the Parada 19 in Santurce.

Before foundation
Before the school was founded, a small school affiliated with the church had existed on the current parking lot grounds of the church.  This early school was housed in a wooden structure that was destroyed when Hurricane Philip struck Puerto Rico in 1928.  This early school had only been an elementary school that had added a new grade every year.

References

External links 
 

Catholic secondary schools in Puerto Rico
Educational institutions established in 1928
1928 establishments in Puerto Rico